Special regulation signs are road signs that are used to indicate a regulation or danger warning applying to one or more traffic lanes, indicate to lanes reserved for buses, indicate the beginning or end of a built-up area or signs having zonal validity.

Special regulation signs are usually square or rectangle with a blue ground and a light coloured symbol or inscription or with a light coloured ground and a dark coloured symbol or inscription.

References

Traffic signs